Marcin Krzywicki (born 29 November 1986 in Bydgoszcz) is a Polish footballer.

Career

Club
He made his first appearance in the Ekstraklasa in September 2008.

In July 2011, he was loaned to Ruch Radzionków on a one-year deal.

References

External links 
 

1986 births
Living people
Sportspeople from Bydgoszcz
Polish footballers
Ekstraklasa players
MKS Cracovia (football) players
Zawisza Bydgoszcz players
Unia Janikowo players
Ruch Radzionków players
Wisła Płock players
Ząbkovia Ząbki players
Widzew Łódź players
Association football forwards